Pilichikuzhi is a village in the Udayarpalayam taluk of Ariyalur district, Tamil Nadu, India.

Demographics 

As per the 2001 census, Pilichikuzhi had a total population of 2067 with 1044 males and 1023 females.

References 

Villages in Ariyalur district